Tracy, later named Muncy is an unincorporated community in Texas County, Oklahoma, United States. The Panhandle Townsite Company (Owned by owners of the BM&E railroad) platted Tracy on May 1st 1931, intending for the community to become a commercial and agricultural center for the region on the BM&E line that extended from Forgan, Oklahoma to Keyes, Oklahoma. The Tracey Woodframe Grain Elevator in Muncy is listed on the National Register of Historic Places. Fred C. Tracy was the namesake of this town platted by the Panhandle Townsite Company, Fred Tracy was a secretary of the BM&E for several years. Tracy, unlike many other towns on the line failed to prosper. Arriving during the dust bowl had its obvious effects. In later years the diesel locomotive tacked yet another nail, being that Diesel engines did not have to stop every 10 miles as the steam engines did. Eva, Oklahoma to its west had greater success and an elevator there still remains today. The wood frame elevator did continue operation until around 1983. All that remains today is a scalehouse which may have been remnant of the depot and the fallen wood frame elevator. The remains of the stock pens which once shipped cattle remain to the northeast. The scars of the once upon a time rail still show their path, the rails themselves however sold to Mexico in the mid 1970’s. Milepost 77 of the line straightened out here at Tracy, to finish its jog due west to mile post 103.5, end of track, Keyes, Oklahoma.

References

Unincorporated communities in Texas County, Oklahoma
Unincorporated communities in Oklahoma
Populated places established in 1929
Oklahoma Panhandle